V-Focus is a 2016 Taiwanese television series starring Melvin Sia, Ling Hung, Huang Wei Ting and Yorke Sun. Filming began on September 21, 2016, and is filmed as it airs. The original broadcast began on October 26, 2016, on SET Metro, airing weekdays (Monday through Friday) at 8:00 pm.

Synopsis
They are enemies in their professional lives. Chiang Chih Heng (Melvin Sia) is a former mercenary who now is known as “The Bodyguard.” He is the owner of Krisis, a security consultancy company that protects public figures who are chased by the paparazzi. Ting Ruo Chin (Huang Wei Ting) is nicknamed the “Variety Queen” for her dogged ability to chase down celebrity gossip exclusives as a tabloid journalist for “V-Focus.” On their way to a news event, Chih Heng and Ruo Chin become stranded on a desert island together. What will become of these professional enemies?

Cast

Main cast
Melvin Sia 謝佳見 as Jiang Zhi Heng 姜至衡
?? as young Zhi Heng
Ling Hung 洪小鈴 as Zhou Xin Yi 周心儀
?? as young Xin Yi
Huang Wei Ting 黃薇渟 as Ding Ruo Qin 丁若芹
Yorke Sun 孫沁岳 as Ke Guo Long 柯國隆
Qiu Chen En 邱辰恩 as young Guo Long

Supporting cast
Angela Lee 李佳豫 as Jiang Wen Li 蔣文莉
Hao-Hsuan Hsu 徐浩軒 as Huang Zi Kai 黃子凱
Tannie Huang 黃妤榛 as Cai Pei Zhen 蔡佩真 (Ella)
Huang Zheng Hao 黃政浩 as Gao Chao Qun 高超群
Ryan Kuo 郭鑫 as Liu Ming Lei 劉明磊
William Yang  楊永維 as Eagle
Hank Wang 王淮仲 as Zhao Jia Rui 趙家銳
Lin Jun Yong 林埈永 as Marten
Chen Xun 陳勳 as Condor

Cameos
Jerry Huang 黃志瑋 as Wu Jian Ye 吳建業
 as reporter
Pei Pei 佩佩 as Yang Fen Fen 楊芬芬
Stephenie Lim 林美貞 as Bai Jia Qi 白佳琪
Jacko Chiang 蔣偉文 as He Cheng Zhang 賀成章
Chang Han 張翰 as Wang Qing Hua 王清華
Alina Fang Ting Alina 芳婷 as Xiao Jie 小潔
 as Li Bing Huang 李秉皇
Brian Pien 邊權 as Daniel
Michael Tao 陶傳正 as Wen Li’s father
David Chiu 邱昊奇 as Li Pin Yi 李品逸
Yang Yu Qi 楊煜奇 as priest
Wei Yi 惟毅 as Wang Chong Guang 王崇光
Fu Lei 傅雷 as Zhou Tie Xiong 周鐵雄
Lin Xiu Jun 林秀君 as Zhou Chen Xin  周陳心蘭
Bruce Chen 陳為民 as Pin Yi’s manager
Yi Tian 竩恬 as Yang Ke Xin 楊可欣
Ti-Men Kan 乾德門 as noodle stand owner
Zhang Yu Ci 張淯詞 as Ci Ci 慈慈
Wu Jing Lin 吳京麟 as skater boy
Ally Chiu 邱偲琹 as Du Xiao Shu 杜曉書 (Tina)
?? as Jiang Yue Ru 姜月如
Wang Xiao Cheng 王孝程 as Wang Biao 王驫
Yvonne Yao 姚采穎 as Sister Ling 玲姐
?? as Xiao He 小何
Daniel Tsai 蔡力允 as Fu Shao Dong 傅紹東
Shen Meng-Sheng 沈孟生 as Liang Zhao Xiang 梁兆祥
Wu Tao 吳濤 as Li Bao Sheng 李寶生
Wang Qian 王謙	as Xin Yi's ex-boyfriend
?? as Wang Tai Shan 王泰山
Wei Wen Liang 魏文良 as Qian Jin Da 錢晉達
Fifi Wang 王偊菁 as news anchor
Jack Lee 李運慶 as He Hao Xuan 何浩軒
Anny Lin 林容安 as news anchor
Lo Pei-An 羅北安 as Ou Guo Liang 歐國良
Yuan Xiao Wan 苑曉琬 as news anchor
Wang De Sheng 王德生 as Li You De 李友德
Derek Chang 張軒睿 as Tiger

Soundtrack

V-Focus Original TV Soundtrack (OST) (獨家保鑣 原聲帶) was released on December 30, 2016 by various artists under Rock Records. It contains 10 tracks total, in which 8 songs are various instrumental versions of the songs. The opening theme is track 1 "Roll Your Eyes 翻白眼" by 831 八三夭, while the closing theme is track 2 "Passing Smile 微笑帶過" by Shi Shi 孫盛希.

Track listing

Songs not featured on the official soundtrack album.
Skater Kids Won't Be Bad 玩滑板的孩子不會變壞 by 831 八三夭
That Last Day 塌下來 by Shi Shi 孫盛希
Suspicion 嫌疑 by Shi Shi 孫盛希
Where Will You Go by Shi Shi 孫盛希
Disappeared 不見了 by Nine Chen 陳零九

Broadcast

Episode ratings
Competing dramas on rival channels airing at the same time slot were:
SET Taiwan - Taste of Life
FTV - Spring Flower
TTV - Fighting Meiling, All in 700
CTV - The Age of Innocence, Let It Fly
CTS - W

Awards and nominations

References

External links
V-Focus SETTV Official website 
V-Focus EBC Website 
 

2016 Taiwanese television series debuts
2017 Taiwanese television series endings
Sanlih E-Television original programming
Eastern Television original programming
Taiwanese romance television series
Television series about journalism